Mehrablı (also, Mekhrably) is a village and municipality in the Aghjabadi Rayon of Azerbaijan.  It has a population of 1,370.

References 

Populated places in Aghjabadi District